Montreal North  is a borough (arrondissement) of the city of Montreal, Quebec, Canada. It consists entirely of the former city of Montréal-Nord on Island of Montreal in southwestern Quebec. It was amalgamated into the City of Montreal on January 1, 2002.

Around the start of the 21st century, Montréal-Nord developed a reputation of being one of Montreal's most dangerous boroughs, along with Hochelaga-Maisonneuve. The area contains a sizable community living below the poverty line, though it also has middle-class and upper-middle-class residences. It's also home to one of Canada's largest Haitian communities.

Geography

The borough is an oblong municipal division situated along the Rivière des Prairies, in the northeastern part of the island.

It is bordered to the west by Ahuntsic-Cartierville, to the southwest by Villeray–Saint-Michel–Parc-Extension, to the south by Saint Leonard, at the southeast corner by Anjou, and to the east by Rivière-des-Prairies–Pointe-aux-Trembles. The borough counts 29 parks and leisure structures].

Major thoroughfares in Montréal-Nord include Saint-Michel Blvd., Pie IX Blvd. (Autoroute 25), Lacordaire Blvd., Langelier Blvd., Léger Blvd., and Henri-Bourassa Blvd. The Pie IX Bridge connects Montréal-Nord to the Laval district of Saint-Vincent-de-Paul.

It has an area of 11.07 km² and a population of 83,911.

Politics

Federal and provincial elections
The borough is located almost entirely in the federal riding of Bourassa, except for a tiny southeastern corner in Honoré-Mercier.

The provincial electoral district of Bourassa-Sauvé is coterminous with the borough except for a northwestern section in the electoral district of Maurice-Richard.

Demographics
Source:

Government

Borough council

According to the 2016 Census, visible minorities made up 48.7% of the population.

Education

Primary and secondary schools
The Commission scolaire de la Pointe-de-l'Île (CSPÎ) operates French-language public schools. Public high schools that are part of this school board in this borough are École secondaire Calixa-Lavallée and École Secondaire Henri-Bourassa. There is also the Le Prélude program. There are 14 Francophone primary schools in Montréal-Nord.

The English Montreal School Board operates Anglophone public schools:
 Galileo Adult Education Centre (Centre d'éducation des adultes Galileo) 
 Lester B Pearson High School
 Gerald McShane School

Prior to 1998 it was in the Montreal Catholic School Commission (CECM) and the Protestant School Board of Greater Montreal, as at that time public schools were by religious denomination instead of on linguistic lines. In 1998 some schools in the eastern portion of CECM were transferred to the former area of Commission scolaire Jérôme-Le Royer, which at that time became the territory of the CSPÎ.

Public libraries
The borough has four libraries of the Montreal Public Libraries Network: Belleville, Bibliothèque de la Maison culturelle et communautaire, Charleroi, and Henri-Bourassa.

See also
 Boroughs of Montreal
 Districts of Montreal
 Municipal reorganization in Quebec

References

External links
 Borough website (in French)

Afro-Caribbean culture in Canada
Black Canadian culture in Quebec
Black Canadian settlements
Boroughs of Montreal
Former cities in Quebec
Haitian-Canadian culture in Quebec
 
Populated places disestablished in 2002
2002 disestablishments in Quebec
Poverty in Canada
Canada geography articles needing translation from French Wikipedia